Pulau Anak Bukom is a small 0.2-hectare islet located to the south west of Singapore, between Pulau Bukom and Pulau Bukom Kechil. Anak Bukom means "child of Bukom" in Malay, a reference to its small size and location just next to Pulau Bukom.

External links 
Satellite image of Pulau Anak Bukum - Google Maps

Anak Bukom
Western Islands Planning Area